Multani is a Brahmic script originating in the Multan region of Punjab and in northern Sindh, Pakistan. It was used to write Saraiki language, often considered a dialect of Lahnda group of languages. The script was used for routine writing and commercial activities. Multani is one of four Landa scripts whose usage was extended beyond the mercantile domain and formalized for literary activity and printing; the others being Gurmukhi, Khojki, and Khudabadi. Although Multani is now obsolete, it is a historical script in which written and printed records exist. It was also known as Karikki and as Sarai.

Background and origin
The script is of Brahmic origin. The script originated from Landa script, a derivative of Sharada script. It share similarities with other Landa scripts such as Khojki and Khudawadi.

Usage
The script was used for routine writing and commercial activities. In the early 19th century it was adapted for literary usage when the Baptist Missionary Press produced metal fonts for the script in order to print Christian literature. The first book printed in the Multani script was the New Testament (1819). In the latter half of the 19th century, the British administration introduced the Arabic script as the standard for the languages of Sindh, which led to the demise of the Landa script of the region. The Multani script is no longer used and Saraiki is now written using an extension of the Arabic script.

Characters

Two different styles are observed over the course of the 19th century, with the later style representing a simplified version of the original style. Some consonants begin to represent their aspirated and implosive forms. The script also functions more as an abjad than as an abugida, as vowels are not marked unless the word is monosyllabic and as there are no dependent vowel signs, only independent ones that can appear at the beginning of a word, as with other Indic scripts. There is no virama, and consonant clusters are written with independent consonants. There is one section mark punctuation that has been identified. The independent vowels, of which there are only four, represent both short and long forms of the independent vowels in addition to phonological variations, and 'i' sometimes represents 'ya'. Ultimately, many consonants represent multiple sounds, and the digits largely represent those found in Gurmukhi, with the exception of 6 and 7, which resemble Devanagari more closely.

Unicode

Multani script was added to the Unicode Standard in June, 2015 with the release of version 8.0.

The Unicode block for Multani is U+11280–U+112AF:

References

Brahmic scripts
Obsolete writing systems
Sarada scripts
Saraiki language